Blackhoof Creek is a stream located entirely within Auglaize County, Ohio.

Blackhoof Creek was named after Black Hoof, a Shawnee Indian chief.

See also
List of rivers of Ohio

References

Rivers of Auglaize County, Ohio
Rivers of Ohio